Al-Shamal Stadium was a proposed football stadium in Ash-Shamal, Qatar. It was proposed as part of the Qatar 2022 FIFA World Cup bid, and would have had a capacity of 45,120. After the World Cup, the stadium would have been downsized to 25,000. The stadium was not built, and other venues will host games at Qatar 2022.

Plans
The design was by Albert Speer & Partners, and was derived from the traditional dhow, the local fishing boats commonly used in Arab States of the Persian Gulf.

See also 

 Al-Shamal SC Stadium - 5,000 seater stadium located nearby, home to Al-Shamal SC

References

Proposed stadiums
Proposed buildings and structures in Qatar